Yevgeny Petrov (born 16 October 1938) is a former Soviet sports shooter and Olympic medalist. He won Gold medal in skeet shooting at the 1968 Summer Olympics in Mexico City, and a silver medal in 1972.

References

1938 births
Living people
Sportspeople from Moscow
Russian male sport shooters
Soviet male sport shooters
Skeet shooters
Olympic shooters of the Soviet Union
Olympic gold medalists for the Soviet Union
Olympic silver medalists for the Soviet Union
Shooters at the 1968 Summer Olympics
Shooters at the 1972 Summer Olympics
Olympic medalists in shooting
Medalists at the 1968 Summer Olympics
Medalists at the 1972 Summer Olympics